An authorization to transport (ATT) is a permit issued under the Canadian Firearms Program allowing transportation of restricted and prohibited firearms in Canada. An ATT may be issued to a firearms licensee, or to a non-resident of Canada not possessing a firearms licence. Section 19 of the Firearms Act (FA) details the various reasons for transportation which may be approved by the chief provincial firearms officer (CFO).    
    
While not a specific requirement under the FA, ATTs issued for regular trips for up to five years are usually reserved for people who belong to an approved shooting range. Under the FA, section 67, a CFO considering a licence renewal must confirm whether a restricted firearm or prohibited handgun is being used by the licence holder for the legitimate reasons found in FA section 28. To prove one has a licence to permit target shooting, regular trips to the gun range or club must be made, and repeated one-time ATTs would be a waste of resources. In contrast, a gun collector under FA section 30 might transport firearms occasionally, thus a one-time ATT would make sense.

In theory, a CFO should issue an ATT to any authorized person who provides one of the listed reasons, as long as the CFO is satisfied that the transport "will not endanger public safety". A CFO can impose a variety of conditions on an ATT, under section 58(1) of the FA. Exercise of this discretion has led to proposed litigation against the CFO in Ontario.
  
In order to transport a restricted or prohibited firearm it must be unloaded. It also must have a functional trigger lock and be kept in a locked opaque case. Ammunition may be carried with the firearm or separately stored, provided it is not loaded in the gun (i.e., magazines may contain ammo, but may not be loaded in the firearm).

Restricted firearms include, but are not limited to, handguns.  All handguns are, at a minimum, restricted in Canada. Some handguns are also antique and do not require a licence. Many handguns (common in the United States) are prohibited firearms in Canada, as their barrel length is 105 mm or less, or they are a prohibited calibre (.25 and .32).

Bill C-42 amended the FA, which caused ATTs to become a condition of a licence. "Authorizations to Transport become a condition of a licence for certain routine and lawful activities such as target shooting; taking a firearm home after a transfer; going to a gunsmith, gun show, a Canadian port of exit; or a peace officer or a Chief Firearms Officer (CFO) for verification, registration or disposal". Effective September 2, 2015, these changes to the FA came into force meaning an ATT became a condition of a licence for the foregoing routine and lawful activities. In other words, an ATT is automatically included into any valid possession and acquisition licence.

See also
 Authorization to carry

References

External links
 RCMP Information Sheet: Application for an Authorization to Transport Restricted Firearms and Prohibited Firearms

Canadian firearms law